The women's 200 metres event at the 1967 Pan American Games was held in Winnipeg on 1 and 2 August.

Medalists

Results

Heats
Wind:Heat 1: +3.3 m/s, Heat 2: +1.0 m/s

Final
Wind: +4.1 m/s

References

Athletics at the 1967 Pan American Games
1967